The Habib Bouakeul Stadium is a multi-use stadium in Oran, Algeria. It is currently used mostly for football matches and is the home ground of ASM Oran. Another club, SCM Oran also play there. The stadium holds 20,000 people.

History
The stadium was built in 1927 in the Les Amandiers district (now Haï El-Louz) of Oran under the name of the Stade Alenda. It was renovated on 19 December 1948, when its name was changed to Stade Vincent Monréal; it was the biggest stadium in Oran at the time. After the independence of Algeria, it was renamed Stade Habib Bouakeul in commemoration of Habib Bouakeul, a martyr of the Algeria War.

The stadium was equipped with artificial turf to replace natural grass; a newer turf was installed in 2013.

Matches
Below is a list of some important matches played at the stadium:

See also 
List of football stadiums in Algeria
Ahmed Zabana Stadium
Abdelkader Fréha Stadium

External links 
 lahbib bouakel stadium - goalzz.com

Football venues in Algeria
Sports venues in Oran
Stadium
Multi-purpose stadiums in Algeria
Sports venues completed in 1927
1927 establishments in Algeria